United Launch Alliance (ULA), legally United Launch Alliance, LLC, is an American spacecraft launch service provider that has manufactured and operated a number of rocket vehicles that are capable of launching spacecraft into orbits around Earth and to other bodies in the Solar System and beyond. The company, which is a joint venture between Lockheed Martin Space and Boeing Defense, Space & Security, was formed in December 2006. Launch customers of the United Launch Alliance include the Department of Defense (DoD), NASA, and other organizations.

ULA provides launch services using expendable launch systems Delta IV Heavy and Atlas V, and until 2018 the medium-lift Delta II. The Atlas, Delta IV Heavy and the retired Delta IV launch systems have launched payloads including weather, telecommunications, and national security satellites, scientific probes and orbiters. ULA also launches commercial satellites. ULA has announced the retirement of its two remaining launch vehicles, which will be replaced by Vulcan Centaur.

, the company is developing the Vulcan Centaur, a successor to the Atlas V and Delta IV. The maiden flight is planned to take place in 2023, launching Astrobotic Technology's Peregrine lunar lander.

Company history

Formation 
Boeing and Lockheed Martin announced their intent to form a 50-50 joint venture on 2 May 2005 aiming to consolidate the manufacture and deployment of US government expendable launch vehicles and launch services. The United Launch Alliance name was announced at the same time. Prior to the creation of the United Launch Alliance and contrary to expectations of the Office of the Secretary of Defense, a strong, competitive commercial launch market did not materialize within the United States. Estimated prices for future contracts and program costs increased, resulting in a Nunn-McCurdy cost breach. There was also considerable turmoil within the United States Air Force (USAF) space community and between the two EELV launch service providers due to competition in the shrinking space launch market, cost increases, and the growing need for reliable access to space. This turmoil culminated in civil and criminal fraud accusations being brought against Boeing relating to the improper use of competitors' information and racketeering.

As a result, the United States Department of Defense changed its acquisition strategy to one which would maintain assured access to space. Under the "Buy III" program, all fixed costs were covered by the US government, which brought about a deal between the two major EELV contractors to combine their efforts into a single company. Annual savings were estimated to be US$100-150 million. SpaceX challenged the legality of the launch services monopoly on 23 October 2005 on anti-trust grounds, creating competition with reusable launch systems. The Federal Trade Commission gave ULA anti-trust clearance on 3 October 2006.

It was the FTC's opinion that due to the challenge of entering the government medium-to-heavy launch services market, the entry of SpaceX was unlikely to reverse the anti-competitive effects resulting from the formation of ULA, but, it approved the joint venture on the basis that the benefits of assured access to space for national security outweighed anti-competitive harm.

The commission required ULA to "cooperate on equivalent terms with all providers of government space vehicles ... provide equal consideration and support to all launch service providers when seeking any U.S. government delivery in orbit contract ... and to safeguard competitively sensitive information obtained from other providers of space vehicles and launch services".

Michael Gass era (2005-2014) 
ULA merged the production and operation of the two companies' government space launch services into one central plant in Decatur, Alabama, and merged all engineering into another central facility in Littleton, Colorado. The parent companies retained responsibility for marketing and sales of the Delta and Atlas rockets.

ULA had a peak of seven space launch facilities between 2005 and 2011, including three Delta II launchpads, which were decommissioned starting in 2011. Two years after its formation, in late 2008, ULA announced it would lay off 350 of its 4200 workers in early 2009. In the event, ULA had approximately 3900 employees by August 2009. ULA joined the Commercial Spaceflight Federation (CSF) in June 2010 as an executive member. ULA's CEO Michael Gass described the company's membership as a "natural fit for us, and we are proud to do so". By May 2014, ULA's membership of the CSF had lapsed.

With the introduction of competition from lower-cost launch providers and the annually increasing costs of ULA launches, increased attention has been paid to the amounts ULA has received for U.S. government launch contracts and for its annual government funding of $1 billion for launch capability and readiness. This readiness requirement included the maintenance of five launch pads and a number of variants of the Delta II, Delta IV, Delta IV Heavy, and Atlas V rockets. As a result of increasing costs by ULA, in April 2012, the EELV program triggered a critical Nunn-McCurdy cost breach and a reassessment of the program, of which ULA was the sole participant.

An uncontested USAF block-purchase of 36 rocket cores for up to 28 launches, which was valued at US$11 billion, was awarded in December 2013 and drew protest from SpaceX, which said the cost of ULA's launches were approximately US$460 million each and proposed a price of US$90 million to provide similar launches. In response, ULA's CEO Michael Gass said its average launch price was US$225 million, with future launches as low as US$100 million.

Tory Bruno era (2014 onward) 

Michael Gass stepped down as ULA's CEO in August 2014 and was replaced by Tory Bruno, former vice president and general manager of Lockheed Martin Strategic and Missile Defense Systems. ULA entered into a partnership with Blue Origin in September 2014 to develop the BE-4 LOX / methane engine to replace the RD-180 on a new, lower cost first-stage booster rocket. At the time, the engine was in its third year of development by Blue Origin. ULA said it expected the new stage and engine to start flying no earlier than 2019 on a successor to the Atlas V. A month later, ULA announced a major restructuring of processes and workforce to halve launch costs, partly due to competition from SpaceX. The United States Government Accountability Office (GAO) calculated the average cost of each ULA rocket launch for the U.S. government had risen to approximately US$420 million in 2014.

ULA had less success securing deals for Earth observation, commercial communication, and privately owned satellites than it had with launching U.S. military payloads. In November 2014, Tory Bruno stated the structuring was intended to "lead to improvements in how ULA interacts with its customers, both governmental and commercial", shorten launch cycles, and halve launch costs again. Part of that program involved the development of a new rocket, the Vulcan, initially with private funds, to tackle "skyrocketing launch costs". Bruno believed the new, lower-cost launcher could be competitive in the commercial satellite sector. ULA intended to have preliminary design ideas in place for a blending of the Atlas V and Delta IV technology by the end of 2014 but the high-level design was not announced until April 2015.

In February 2016, it was announced the development of the Vulcan rocket would be funded via a public–private partnership with the U.S. government. By early 2016, the USAF had committed $201 million of funding for Vulcan development. ULA had not "put a firm price on the cost of Vulcan development" but according to Mike Gross of SpaceNews, Bruno "said new rockets typically cost US$2 billion, including US$1 billion for the main engine". In 2016, ULA had asked the U.S. government to provide a minimum of $1.2 billion by 2020 to assist the development of the new U.S. launch vehicle. It was unclear how the change in development funding mechanisms would change ULA plans for pricing market-driven launch services. Since Vulcan development began in October 2014, the privately generated funding for Vulcan development has been approved only on a short-term basis. The ULA board of directors, which was composed of executives from Boeing and Lockheed Martin, would approve development funding on a quarterly basis. ULA planned to reduce its number of launchpads from five in 2015 to two.

ULA released contract values to the public and new CEO Tory Bruno testified before Congress in March 2015 that while ULA receives government subsidies "to conduct national security launches", the same is true of SpaceX, which received funding "to develop new capabilities and the use of low-cost or no-cost leases of previously developed launch infrastructure". It is difficult to directly compare launch costs because they are not necessarily calculated using the same cost-model assumptions.

ULA announced in February 2015 it was considering undertaking domestic production of the Russian RD-180 rocket engine at the Decatur, Alabama, rocket stage manufacturing facility. The U.S.-manufactured engines would be used for government civil (NASA) or commercial launches, and would not be used for U.S. military launches. This idea was abandoned following the passage of legislation permitting the continued purchase of the RD-180 from Russia.

In May 2015, ULA stated it would go out of business unless it won commercial and civil satellite launch orders to offset an expected slump in U.S. military and spy launches. The same month, ULA announced it would lay off 12 of its executives, a reduction of 30%, in December 2015. The management layoffs were the "beginning of a major reorganization and redesign" as ULA endeavors to "slash costs and hunt out new customers to ensure continued growth despite the rise of SpaceX".

A controversy arose in March 2016 following public remarks by ULA VP of Engineering, Brett Tobey, whose comments were, according to Peter de Selding of SpaceNews, "resentful of SpaceX" and dismissive of one of the two competitors (Aerojet Rocketdyne) for the new engine that will power the Vulcan launch vehicle, which was under development. Tobey resigned on 16 March 2016 and Bruno disavowed the remarks. Senator John McCain asked the DoD to investigate the comments that implied it may have shown "favoritism to a major defense contractor or that efforts have been made to silence members of Congress". The Secretary of Defense asked the DoD's Inspector General to investigate.

In 2016, ULA released the Cislunar 1000 Vision with an aim of creating an economy on the Moon and in Earth orbit with 1,000 people living and working in space. Core to this aim was that the production of fuel in space would allow for dramatically cheaper space travel. ULA made clear it was willing to become a customer for in-space refueling. It previously announced a willingness to pay US$3,000 per kilogram for fuel delivered in low Earth orbit, US$500 per kilogram on the lunar surface, and US$1,000 per kilogram at L1. ULA believes it will need off-Earth propellant supplies sometime in the 2020s. In December 2016, ULA created an online pricing tool called "Rocket Builder", which allowed potential customers and the public to estimate launch costs of the Atlas V rocket with configurable orbits, payloads and launch services. Purchase-price estimates were removed from the tool in 2018 because it potentially provided commercially sensitive information to ULA's competitors. Despite ULA's cost-cutting and restructuring, the cheapest ULA space launch in early 2018 remained the Atlas V 401 at a price of approximately US$109 million.

Following the failure of a SpaceX Falcon 9 carrying AMOS-6, incorrect reports about potential corporate espionage by ULA circulated. These reports were proved to be false and on 2 January 2017 SpaceX released an official statement saying the cause of the failure was a buckled liner in several of the COPV tanks.

In July 2017 the company was awarded US$191 million single-launch contract to launch the STP-3 mission aboard the heavy-lift Atlas V 551.

In January 2018, ULA took over marketing and sales responsibilities for Atlas V launches. Dan Collins, ULA's inaugural Chief operating officer, retired in April 2018 and was replaced by John Elbon, former vice president and program manager at Boeing Defense, Space & Security.

During the 2019–2020 COVID-19 pandemic, some aspects of ULA's launch related outreach were scaled back but the company said it would maintain its launch schedule.

On 7 August 2020, the U.S. Space Force awarded contracts for the second phase of its long-term launch services program for national security launches through 2020. United Launch Alliance, along with SpaceX, was chosen over Blue Origin and Northrop Grumman. The decision was driven primarily by past launch performance. As ULA has had 100% success record in about two decades of operation, it was awarded 60% of the contract.

In late 2020, ULA won a contract to launch and provide in-flight refueling for the Dynetics lunar lander. Initially, refueling would be provided by launching additional rockets to carry fuel. Each lunar mission would include two other Vulcan Centaur launches. The propellant from the upper stages of these rockets would be transferred to the Dynetics lander. ULA would significantly increase its launch pace of refueling rockets to minimize the boil-off of cryogenic fuel. The in-space refueling capability would have been tested in low Earth orbit before any lunar missions take place. However, in April 2021, NASA announced that SpaceX would instead be the prime contractor for the crewed lunar lander, having ranked the Dynetics bid low in readiness by 2024.

In September 2020, Tory Bruno announced that it had found a vendor in its supply chain that has partial Chinese ownership. The vendor designed software tools for use in development of the Vulcan Centaur rocket. Bruno said the vendor did not acquire any sensitive information. The company in question is KUKA Robotics. The Chinese interest in the vendor was discovered by a private investigator hired by ULA to monitor the security of its supply chain. The case was referred to the FBI. Bruno called on the federal government to cooperate more closely with the private sector to deal with Chinese corporate espionage.

In August 2021, ULA announced the pending retirement of Atlas V. Following the Russian annexation of Crimea in 2014, the U. S. Congress had mandated that the Department of Defense would stop using Russian-built space hardware, including the RD-180 engine used on Atlas V. ULA planned an orderly retirement and had procured and had in hand 100 of the engines to continue building Atlas V as it developed a replacement rocket. At the time of the announcement they could fly 29 more missions and all of them had been sold, so no new orders would be accepted.

By authority of Tory Bruno, United Launch Alliance implemented a vaccination requirement for its employees on 1 September 2021. ULA employees were required to receive a first dose by 30 September and any required second dose by 31 October 2021.

Launch vehicles and stages 

As of 2023, ULA still operates the Atlas V and Delta IV Heavy rockets, both of which are retiring. Both were developed under the National Security Space Launch (NSSL) program by Lockheed Martin and Boeing respectively, both launching in 2002. The Delta IV Medium was retired on 22 August 2019, but the remaining two Delta IV Heavy rockets will be used to launch heavy payloads, one in 2023 and one in 2024. ULA is developing Vulcan, a heavy-lift launch vehicle that will replace its existing fleet. The first Vulcan certification flight was originally expected to launch in 2019.  it is expected to launch in the first quarter of 2023.

Current fleet

Atlas V 

Atlas V is ULA's main launch active vehicle even though it is retiring. All remaining Atlas V flights have been sold and no more orders will be accepted.  Atlas V has flown 98 times since its first flight in 2002. 19 flights remain.

Atlas V is the fifth major version in the Atlas rocket family. It is an expendable launch system that was originally designed by Lockheed Martin. Each Atlas V rocket consists of two main stages. The first stage is powered by a Russian RD-180 engine, which is manufactured by RD Amross, and burns kerosene and liquid oxygen. Each RD-180 engine costs about US$10 million which is considerably cheaper than any competing rocket with the ability to launch a satellite to geostationary orbit. It has a flawless record of launching American satellites over many years of service.

The Atlas V has been modified for human spaceflight to support flights of the Boeing Starliner. Human-rating required new computers to monitor performance and trigger an abort when necessary, data links between the rocket and spacecraft, and other changes. Crewed flights will include a mechanism to allow astronauts to manually abort. For Starliner flights,  Atlas V is configured with two SRBs from Aerojet Rocketdyne. This is the only Atlas V configuration ever to fly without a payload fairing and the only configuration with two engines on the upper stage. With the Starliner on top, the rocket is 172 feet tall. ULA has contracted to support nine Starliner missions with Atlas V. The first Starliner mission was the Boeing Orbital Flight Test in December 2019.

In 2017, Sierra Nevada selected the Atlas V to launch the first two missions of the Dream Chaser cargo capsule to the International Space Station. These launches are part of NASA's Cargo Resupply Services 2 contract. At the time of signing its agreement with ULA, Sierra Nevada expected the missions to take place in 2020 and 2021. After schedule delays for Dream chaser and the pending retirement of Atlas V, as of 2023 Dream Chaser is planned to launch on Vulcan Centaur instead.

An Atlas V rocket was selected for the NROL-101 mission for the National Reconnaissance Office. The rocket was launched successfully on 13 November 2020. The variant of the Atlas V selected for this mission used of three new GEM-63 solid rocket booster made by Northrop Grumman. A larger version of this booster, the GEM 63XL, is being developed for the Vulcan Centaur.

Amazon has selected the Atlas V to launch satellites for Project Kuiper. Project Kuiper will offer a high-speed satellite internet service. The contract signed with Amazon is for nine launches. Project Kuiper aims to put thousands of satellites into orbit. ULA is Amazon's first launch provider.

Centaur 

The Centaur is a family of rocket-propelled upper stages currently with one main active version and one version under development. The 3.05-meter diameter Common Centaur/Centaur III flies as the upper stage of the Atlas V launch vehicle, while the 5.4-meter diameter Centaur V is being developed as the upper stage of ULA's new Vulcan rocket. A lengthened version of the Centaur V will be used on the Vulcan Centaur Heavy.

The Centaur upper stage is powered by one or two RL10 engines, which are manufactured by Aerojet Rocketdyne, and burn liquid hydrogen and liquid oxygen. The Centaur is the first rocket stage to use these fuels. On the Atlas V ULA typically only uses the one RL10 version of the Centaur upper stage. However, Aerojet Rocketdyne supplies two RL10A-4-2 engines for each Starliner mission flown by the Atlas V. The dual-engine Centaur configuration is used on human-rated launches for safety reasons. This configuration allows the rocket to fly on a shallower path to orbit, meaning horizontal velocity is emphasized over vertical velocity. This in turn reduces the maximum G-forces endured by the crew and allows for a safe abort at any time during the launch. The standard payload fairings are 4 or 5 meters (13 or 16 ft) in diameter with varying lengths. The dual-engine variant of the Centaur has flown more than 100 times on Atlas variant rockets. 166 of the Centaur's flights have used dual-engine variants. As of late 2019, Centaurs of all kinds had flown 251 times.

The Centaur upper stage for the Atlas V also has an Aft Bulkhead Carrier capacity. The capacity was developed initially for the National Reconnaissance Office to take advantage of the extra capacity Atlas V has.

Delta IV 

Delta IV is a group of five expendable launch systems in the Delta rocket family, which was introduced in the early 2000s. The Delta IV was originally designed by Boeing's Defense, Space & Security division for the Evolved Expendable Launch Vehicle (EELV) program, and became a ULA product in 2006. The Delta IV is mostly used for launching United States Air Force military payloads but has also been used to launch a number of U.S. government non-military payloads and one commercial satellite.

The Delta IV originally had two main versions, which allowed the family to accommodate a range of payload sizes and masses; models include the retired Medium, which had four configurations, and the Heavy. As of 2019, only the Heavy remains active; payloads that would previously fly on Medium moved to either the existing Atlas V or the forthcoming Vulcan Centaur. Retirement of the Delta IV family as a whole is anticipated in 2024.

ICPS 

ULA designed and builds the Interim Cryogenic Propulsion Stage for the Space Launch System (SLS) in Decatur, Alabama and by Boeing in Huntsville, Alabama. It is a variant of a stage used for the Delta rocket family. The ICPS was the first component of the SLS to arrive at Kennedy Space Center in Florida. ICPS will be located high on the SLS stack, just below the Orion capsule.

Delta IV Heavy variant 
The Delta IV Heavy combines a  diameter DCSS and payload fairing with two additional CBCs. These are strap-on boosters which are separated earlier in the flight than the center CBC. As of 2007, a longer 5 meter diameter composite fairing was standard on the Delta IV Heavy, with an aluminum isogrid fairing also available. The aluminum trisector (three-part) fairing was built by Boeing and derived from a Titan IV fairing. The trisector fairing was first used on the DSP-23 flight.

Delta Cryogenic Second Stage 
The Delta Cryogenic Second Stage (DCSS) is a family of cryogenic rocket stages used on the Delta III and Delta IV rockets, and which is planned to be used on the Space Launch System Block 1. DCSS consists of a cylindrical liquid hydrogen tank structurally separated from an oblate spheroid liquid oxygen tank. The liquid hydrogen tank cylinder carries payload launch loads, while the liquid oxygen tank and engine are suspended below within the rocket's interstage. The stage is powered by a single Pratt & Whitney RL10B-2 engine, which features an extendable carbon-carbon nozzle to improve specific impulse.

In development

Vulcan Centaur 

Vulcan is a heavy-lift launch vehicle that ULA is developing to meet the demands of the NSSL competition and launch program. The rocket is ULA's first launch vehicle design, which is adapting and evolving technologies that were developed for the Atlas V and Delta IV rockets. Vulcan is intended to undergo the human-rating certification process to allow the launch of crew in a vehicle such as the Boeing Starliner or a crewed version of the Sierra Nevada Dream Chaser.

The first-stage propellant tanks share the diameter of the Delta IV Common Booster Core but will contain liquid methane and liquid oxygen propellants rather than the Delta IV's liquid hydrogen and liquid oxygen. Blue Origin's BE-4 engine was selected to power Vulcan's first stage in September 2018 after a competition with the Aerojet Rocketdyne's AR1. ULA may use the Sensible Modular Autonomous Return Technology (SMART) which seeks to capture and re-use the BE-4 engines. ULA is working on the 'Sensible Modular Autonomous Return Technology' (SMART) reuse concept. The booster engines, avionics, and thrust structure would be detached as a module from the propellant tanks after booster engine cutoff, with the module descending through the atmosphere under an inflatable heat shield. After parachute deployment, the module would be captured by a helicopter in mid-air. ULA estimated that this would reduce the cost of the first stage propulsion by 90%, and 65% of the total first stage cost. The BE-4 burns liquified natural gas.

Vulcan's upper stage will be the Centaur V, an upgraded variant of the Common Centaur/Centaur III that is currently used on the Atlas V. A lengthened version of the Centaur V will be used on the Vulcan Centaur Heavy. ULA planned to eventually upgrade the Centaur V with Integrated Vehicle Fluids technology to become the Advanced Cryogenic Evolved Stage (ACES). Those plans were dropped in 2020 with efforts focusing on improving the capabilities of the existing Centaur V upper stage. ULA had plans for tanker called XEUS, developed in partnership with Masten Space Systems, that would have been able to land on the moon to be stocked with fuel and then fly to a gravitationally stable libration point in the Earth-Moon system known as L1. XEUS planned to utilize the now abandoned ACES upper stage but this concept has been paused until there a clear commercial need.

During the first several years of its development, the ULA board of directors made quarterly funding commitments to Vulcan Centaur development. , the U.S. government had committed approximately US$1.2 billion in a public–private partnership to Vulcan Centaur development, with future funding being dependent on ULA securing an NSSL contract. By March 2016, the U.S. Air Force had committed up to US$202 million of funding for Vulcan development. At that time, ULA had not yet estimated the total cost of Vulcan development, but CEO Tory Bruno noted that "new rockets typically cost US$2 billion, including US$1 billion for the main engine". In April 2016, ULA Board of Directors member and President of Boeing's Network and Space Systems (N&SS) division Craig Cooning expressed confidence in the possibility of further USAF funding of Vulcan development.

In March 2018, ULA CEO Tory Bruno said that Vulcan-Centaur had been "75% privately funded" up to that time. In October 2018 and following a request for proposals and technical evaluation, ULA was awarded US$967 million to develop a prototype Vulcan launch system as a part of the National Security Space Launch program. Two other providers, Blue Origin and Northrop Grumman Innovation Systems, were awarded US$500 million and US$792 million in development funding, with detailed proposals and a competitive selection process to follow in 2019. The USAF's goal with the next generation of Launch Service Agreements is to get out of the business of "buying rockets" and move to acquire launch services from launch service providers, but U.S. government funding of launch vehicle development continues. The Vulcan rocket, directly and indirectly, provides about 22,000 jobs spread over 46 states.

In August 2020, the U.S. Space Force awarded ULA a firm, fixed-price indefinite-delivery contract to launch 60% of National Security Space Launch (NSSL) Phase 2 missions over a 5-year procurement with the next-generation Vulcan Centaur rocket, the other 40% were won by SpaceX. In September 2020, ULA announced that ULA is carefully studying a "Vulcan Heavy" variant with three booster cores. Speculation about a new variant had been rampant for months after an image of a model of that version popped on social media. Tory Bruno later tweeted a clearer image of the model and said it was the subject of ongoing study.

ULA has been using the Atlas V to test systems for the Vulcan Centaur.

In early 2021, NASA added the Vulcan Centaur to the Launch Services II contract (NLS II). This makes the Vulcan Centaur part of the Launch Services Program and subjects it the "on-ramp" provisions in NLS II. The on-ramp provisions allow existing launch providers to introduce new vehicles that NASA has not yet requested.

Retired

Delta II 

Delta II was an expendable launch system that was originally designed and built by McDonnell Douglas, and was later built by Boeing prior to the formation of ULA. Delta II was part of the Delta rocket family and entered service in 1989. Delta II vehicles included the Delta 6000 and the two later Delta 7000 variants ("Light" and "Heavy"). The rocket flew its final mission ICESat-2 on 15 September 2018. A nearly-complete Delta II, made from flight-qualified spare parts, is displayed in its 7320-10 configuration in the rocket garden at Kennedy Space Center Visitors Complex.

Launch history

2006–2009 

The first launch conducted by ULA was a Delta II from Vandenberg Air Force Base on 14 December 2006, carrying the satellite USA-193 for the National Reconnaissance Office. ULA's first Atlas V launch was in March 2007; it was an Atlas V variant 401 launching six military research satellites for Space Test Program (STP) 1. This mission also performed three burns of the Centaur upper stage; it was the first three-burn mission for Atlas V.

ULA's first commercial mission COSMO-SkyMed was launched on behalf of Italy's Ministry of Defense three months later using a Delta II rocket. On June 15, 2007, the engine in the Centaur upper stage of a ULA-launched Atlas V shut down early, leaving its payload – a pair of NROL-30 ocean surveillance satellites – in a lower than intended orbit. The NRO declared the launch a success.

2007 also saw ULA's first two interplanetary spacecraft launches using the Delta II; the Phoenix probe was launched to Mars in August 2007 and the Dawn satellite to was launched to the asteroids Vesta and Ceres in September 2007. Using a Delta II, the WorldView-1 satellite was also launched into a low Earth orbit on behalf of DigitalGlobe. The company's first launch to geostationary transfer orbit using an Atlas V 421 variant carrying the USA-195 (or WGS-1) communications satellite also occurred that year. ULA's tenth mission was launching satellite GPS IIR-17 into medium Earth orbit on a Delta II. The company completed its first Delta IV launch using the Delta IV Heavy rocket to place a payload into geosynchronous orbit in November 2007, which was followed by three more launches in December 2007.

2008 saw seven launches, including Atlas V's from Vandenberg's Space Launch Complex 3E and five others using the Delta II. The Atlas launch carried NROL-28 in March 2008 and in September 2008 the GeoEye-1 satellite was orbited by a Delta II rocket. ULA completed eight Delta II, five Atlas V, and three Delta IV launches in 2009. The Delta II launches carried three Space Tracking and Surveillance System satellites over two launches, two Global Positioning System satellites, and the NOAA-19 and WorldView-2 satellites, as well as the Kepler and the Wide-field Infrared Survey Explorer space telescopes.

The Atlas launches carried the Lunar Reconnaissance Orbiter and LCROSS mission as part of the Lunar Precursor Robotic Program, which was later intentionally crashed into the Moon and found the existence of water; other 2009 Atlas V launches in included Intelsat 14, WGS-2, PAN, and a weather satellite as part of the Defense Meteorological Satellite Program (DMSP). The Delta IV rockets carried the NROL-26, GOES 14, and WGS-3 satellites.

2010–2014 
In 2010, Atlas V launches deployed the Solar Dynamics Observatory, the first Boeing X-37B, the first Advanced Extremely High Frequency (AEHF) satellite, and the NROL-41. The Delta II system placed the last COSMO-SkyMed and Delta IV launches deployed the GOES 15, GPS Block IIF, and USA-223 satellites. ULA completed eleven launches in 2011, including five by Atlas, three by Delta II, and three by Delta IV. The Atlas system orbited another Boeing X-37, two NROL-34 signals intelligence satellites, a Space-Based Infrared System (SBIS) satellite, the Juno spacecraft and Curiosity rover. The Delta II launches placed the SAC-D and Suomi NPP satellites into orbit, as well as two spacecraft associated with NASA's GRAIL lunar mission. Delta IV launches carried the NROL-49, NROL-27, and another GPS satellite.

ULA's 2012 launches included six Atlas Vs and four Delta IVs. The Atlas system carried Mobile User Objective System (MUOS) and AEHF satellites, another Boeing X-37, the Intruder and Quasar satellites, and the Van Allen Probes. Delta IVs deployed GPS and WGS satellites USA-233, as well as NROL-25 and NROL-15 on behalf of the National Reconnaissance Office.

In 2013, the Atlas flew eight times. The system launched the TDRS-11, Landsat 8, AEHF-3, and NROL-39 satellites, as well as SBIS, GPS, and MUOS satellites, as well as NASA's MAVEN space probe to Mars. Delta IV launches orbited the fifth and sixth Wideband Global SATCOM satellites WGS-5 and WGS-6, as well as NROL-65.

In 2014, ULA's Atlas V orbited the TDRS-12 communications satellite in January, the WorldView-3 commercial satellite in August 2014, and the CLIO communications satellite during September and October 2014. Atlas rockets also carried the satellites DMSP-5D-3/F19, NROL-67, NROL-33, and NROL-35. Delta IV rockets orbited GPS satellites and two Geosynchronous Space Situational Awareness Program satellites, and in July 2014, NASA's Orbiting Carbon Observatory 2 was carried by a Delta II. Orion's first test flight was launched by a Delta IV Heavy rocket in December 2014, as part of Exploration Flight Test-1.

2015–2019 
A Delta II rocket orbited a Soil Moisture Active Passive satellite in January 2015. In March 2015, an Atlas V rocket carried NASA's Magnetospheric Multiscale Mission spacecraft, and a Delta IV rocket orbited the GPS IIF-9 satellite on behalf of the U.S. Air Force. The U.S. Air Force's X-37B spaceplane was carried by an Atlas V rocket in May 2015, and a Delta IV orbited the WGS-7 satellite in July 2015. The fourth MUOS satellite was orbited by an Atlas V in September 2015. ULA's 100th consecutive successful liftoff was completed on 2 October 2015, when an Atlas V rocket orbited a Mexican Satellite System communications satellite on behalf of the Secretariat of Communications and Transportation. The classified NROL-55 satellite was launched by an Atlas V rocket several days later. Atlas V rockets launched GPS Block IIF satellites and the Cygnus cargo spacecraft in November 2015 and December 2015, respectively.

In 2016, Delta IV rockets carried the NROL-45 satellite and Air Force Space Command 6 mission in February 2016 and August 2016, respectively. During a launch of the Atlas V rocket on 22 March 2016, a minor first-stage anomaly led to shutdown of the first-stage engine approximately five seconds before anticipated. The Centaur upper stage was able to compensate by firing for approximately one minute longer than planned using its reserved fuel margin. Atlas V rockets carried MUOS-5 in June 2016, NROL-61 satellites in July 2016, and the OSIRIS-REx spacecraft in September 2016.

ULA launched multiple satellites in late 2016. The weather satellite Geostationary Operational Environmental Satellite (GOES-R) was carried in November 2016, as was the WorldView-4 imaging satellite. In December 2016, the Wideband Global SATCOM's eighth satellite WGS-8 was launched on a Delta IV Medium rocket, and an Atlas V carried the EchoStar XIX communications satellite on behalf of Hughes Communications. In March 2017, WGS-9 was orbited by a Delta IV. Atlas V rockets carried NRO satellites, TDRS-M, and a Cygnus cargo capsule in 2017. The weather satellite NOAA-20 (JPSS-1) was launched by a Delta II rocket in November 2017.

An Atlas V carried the SBIRS-GEO 4 military satellite in January 2018. The Atlas V's launch of NASA's InSight to Mars in 2018 was the first interplanetary probe to depart from the U.S. West Coast. In August 2018, a Delta IV Heavy launched Parker Solar Probe, NASA's solar space probe that will visit and study the sun's outer corona in August 2018. It was also the Delta IV Heavy with a Star-48BV kick stage, and the highest-ever spacecraft velocity. The company launched the final Delta II rocket, carrying ICESat-2 from Vandenberg Air Force Base SLC-2 on 15 September 2018. This marks the last launch of a Delta family rocket based on the original Thor IRBM. On 22 August 2019, ULA launched its last Delta IV Medium rocket for the GPS III Magellan project. An Atlas V carried Boeing's Starliner Orbital Flight Test (OFT) mission for NASA in December 2019.

2020 
In 2020, an Atlas V carried the Solar Orbiter spacecraft, an international collaboration between the European Space Agency (ESA) and NASA to provide a new global view of the Sun. In March 2020, an Atlas V also launched Advanced Extremely High Frequency 6 (AEHF-6), the first U.S. Space Force National Security Mission. In May 2020, ULA launched an Atlas V rocket carrying the USSF-7 mission with the X-37B spaceplane for the U.S Space Force and the mission honors victims of the COVID-19 pandemic as well as first responders, health professionals, military personnel, and other essentialworkers. On 30 July 2020, Atlas V in the 541 configuration successfully launched Perseverance and Ingenuity as part of Mars 2020 towards Mars. In November 2020, ULA launched NROL-101, a top secret spy satellite for the National Reconnaissance Office, on board their Atlas V in a 531 configuration. This launch was notable because it was the first flight of the GEM-63 solid rocket boosters, a version of which will be used on their Vulcan Centaur launch vehicle.

2021
On 18 May 2021, the SBIRS GEO 5 missile-warning satellite was launched on an Atlas V 421 rocket.

 
The Lucy spaceflight began on 16 October 2021 upon launch aboard a United Launch Alliance Atlas V 401 rocket into a stable parking orbit. During the next hour, the second stage reignited to place Lucy on an interplanetary trajectory in a heliocentric orbit on a twelve-year mission to two groups of Sun-Jupiter Lagrange point Trojan asteroids as well as a close flyby of a mainbelt asteroid during one of three planned passes through the asteroid belt. If the spacecraft remains operational during the 12-year planned duration, it is likely the controlled flight will be continued and directed at additional asteroid targets.

Infrastructure

Launch facilities 

ULA operates orbital launch sites at Cape Canaveral Space Force Station in Cape Canaveral, Florida, and Vandenberg Space Force Base near Lompoc, California. In Florida, ULA has used Space Launch Complex 41 for Atlas V launches since its maiden flight in August 2002, and Launch Complex 37 for Delta IV launches since the rocket's maiden flight in November 2002. Aging infrastructure and low flight cadence from LC-37 contributed to a number of delays in the launch of NROL-44. ULA is looking to mitigate this with improvement to their operations readiness process. The company has two launch pads at Vandenberg as of November 2020. These include Space Launch Complex 3 for Atlas launches and Space Launch Complex 6 for Delta IV and Delta IV Heavy launches. Space Launch Complex 2 is no longer in active use by ULA since the retirement of the Delta II in September 2018.

Launches from Cape Canaveral typically head east to give satellites extra momentum from the rotation of the Earth as they head to other planets or into an equatorial orbit. Vandenberg Space Force Base is the primary U.S. launch site from which satellites are sent into polar orbits. Commercial and military spacecraft like imaging and weather satellites need to be launched southward on a path to reach a polar orbit to cover the entire globe. ULA's Atlas V rocket launched NASA's InSight mission to Mars from the West Coast in 2018, the first interplanetary mission to do so.

In 2015, as part of the company's transition from the Atlas V and Delta IV launch vehicles to the Vulcan Centaur, ULA announced plans to reduce the number of launch pads in use from five to two by the early 2020s.

ULA works closely with the 45th Weather Squadron on its launches from Florida.

Headquarters and manufacturing 

ULA's headquarters in Centennial, Colorado, are responsible for program management, rocket engineering, testing, and launch support functions. A factory in Harlingen, Texas, fabricates and assembles components for the Atlas V rocket. In 2015, the company announced the opening of an engineering and propulsion test center in Pueblo, Colorado.

Spaceflight Processing Operations Center 
The Spaceflight Processing Operations Center (SPOC), located near SLC-40 and SLC-41, is used to construct the mobile launcher platform for the Vulcan Centaur launch vehicle. It also serve as a storage room for the Atlas Mobile launcher platform (MLP). On 6 August 2019, the first two parts of Vulcan's MLP were transported to the SPOC. SPOC was formerly known as the Solid Motor Assembly and Readiness Facility (SMARF) during its support of the Titan IVB launch vehicle; it was renamed during Vulcan Centaur's topping ceremony in October 2019.

See also 

 Aerojet Rocketdyne (RS-68 and RL10)
 Blue Origin (BE-4)
 National Security Space Launch
 Northrop Grumman Innovation Systems (Graphite-Epoxy Motor)
 RUAG Space (payload fairings, composite structures)

Past launch vehicles
 Delta II
 Delta IV Medium

Other launch vehicle providers
 SpaceX
 United Space Alliance
 Deep Space Transport LLC
 Arianespace
 Mitsubishi Heavy Industries
 Roscosmos

References

External links 

 
2006 establishments in Colorado
Boeing
Commercial launch service providers
American companies established in 2006
Companies based in Centennial, Colorado
Joint ventures
Lockheed Martin
Space Act Agreement companies
Space organizations
Technology companies established in 2006